Dan Connolly may refer to:
Dan Connolly (American football) (born 1982), American football player
Dan Connolly (computer scientist)

See also
Daniel W. Connolly (1847–1894), politician